Honey (Open That Door)" is a song written by Mel Tillis and recorded by American country music artist Webb Pierce and by Ricky Skaggs.  Pierce recorded it for his 1962 album Hideaway Heart. It was also a non-charted single by Pierce released in 1974.

Skaggs released his version in February 1984 as the second single from his album Don't Cheat in Our Hometown.  The song was Skaggs' seventh #1 on the country chart.  The single stayed at #1 for one week and spent a total of 11 weeks on the country chart.

Charts

Weekly charts

Year-end charts

References

1984 singles
Webb Pierce songs
Ricky Skaggs songs
Songs written by Mel Tillis
Song recordings produced by Ricky Skaggs
Epic Records singles
1962 songs